Palaemonidae is a family of shrimp in the order Decapoda. Many species are carnivores that eat small invertebrates, and can be found in any aquatic habitat except the deep sea. One significant genus is Macrobrachium, which contains commercially fished species. Others inhabit coral reefs, where they associate with certain invertebrates, such as sponges, cnidarians, mollusks, and echinoderms, as cleaner shrimps, parasites, or commensals. They generally feed on detritus, though some are carnivores and hunt tiny animals.

The family contains more than 1200 species in  160 genera. The genera were formerly split into two subfamilies, but in 2015, molecular and morphological research determined that the subfamily groupings were invalid. At the same time, the members of the families Gnathophyllidae and Hymenoceridae were incorporated into the Palaemonidae.

Genera

The following genera are recognised:

Actinimenes 
Alburnia 
Allopontonia 
Altopontonia 
Amphipontonia 
Anapontonia 
Anchiopontonia 
Anchistioides 
Anchistus 
Ancylocaris 
Ancylomenes 
Anisomenaeus 
Apopontonia 
Arachnochium 
Araiopontonia 
Ascidonia 
Bahiacaris 
Balssia 
Bathymenes 
Bavaricaris 
Bechleja 
Beurlenia 
Blepharocaris 
Brachycarpus 
Brucecaris 
Bruceonia 
Cainonia 
Calathaemon 
Carinopontonia 
Chacella 
Climeniperaeus 
Colemonia 
Conchodytes 
Coralliocaris 
Coutierea 
Creaseria 
Crinotonia 
Cristimenes 
Cryphiops 
Ctenopontonia 
Cuapetes 
Dactylonia 
Dasella 
Dasycaris 
Diapontonia 
Echinopericlimenes 
Epipontonia 
Eupontonia 
Exoclimenella 
Exopontonia 
Fennera 
Gnathophylleptum 
Gnathophylloides 
Gnathophyllum 
Hamiger 
Hamodactyloides 
Hamodactylus 
Hamopontonia 
Harpiliopsis 
Harpilius 
Holthuisaeus 
Homelys 
Hymenocera 
Ischnopontonia 
Isopontonia 
Izucaris 
Jocaste 
Kaviengella 
Kellnerius 
Laomenes 
Leander 
Leandrites 
Leptocarpus 
Leptomenaeus 
Leptopalaemon 
Levicaris 
Lipkebe 
Lipkemenes 
Macrobrachium 
Madangella 
Manipontonia 
Margitonia 
Mesopontonia 
Metapontonia 
Michaelimenes 
Micropsalis 
Miopontonia 
Nematopalaemon 
Neoanchistus 
Neoclimenes 
Neopalaemon 
Neopericlimenes 
Neopontonides 
Nippontonia 
Notopontonia 
Odontonia 
Onycocaridella 
Onycocaridites 
Onycocaris 
Onycomenes 
Opaepupu 
Orthopontonia 
Palaemon 
Palaemonella 
Paraclimenaeus 
Paraclimenes 
Paranchistus 
Parapalaemonetes 
Paratypton 
Patonia 
Periclimenaeus 
Periclimenella 
Periclimenes 
Periclimenoides 
Philarius 
Phycomenes 
Phyllognathia 
Pinnotherotonia 
Platycaris 
Platypontonia 
Plesiomenaeus 
Plesiopontonia 
Pliopontonia 
Pontonia 
Pontonides 
Pontoniopsides 
Pontoniopsis 
Poripontonia 
Propalaemon 
Propontonia 
Pseudocaridinella 
Pseudoclimenes 
Pseudocoutierea 
Pseudopalaemon 
Pseudopontonia 
Pseudopontonides 
Pseudoveleronia 
Pycnocaris 
Rapimenes 
Rapipontonia 
Rhopalaemon 
Rostronia 
Sandimenes 
Sandyella 
Schmelingia 
Stegopontonia 
Tectopontonia 
Tenuipedium 
Thaumastocaris 
Troglindicus 
Troglocubanus 
Troglomexicanus 
Tuleariocaris 
Typton 
Typtonoides 
Typtonomenaeus 
Typtonychus 
Unesconia 
Unguicaris 
Urocaridella 
Urocaris 
Veleronia 
Veleroniopsis 
Vir 
Waldola 
Yemenicaris 
Yongjicaris 
Zenopontonia 
Zoukaris 

Some of the genera were formerly placed in the family Gnathophyllidae, which is no longer recognized. These shrimp were often associated with echinoderms, and consisted of about 14 species in five genera:
Gnathophylleptum d'Udekem d'Acoz, 2001
Gnathophylloides Schmitt, 1933
Gnathophyllum Latreille, 1819
Levicaris Bruce, 1973
Pycnocaris Bruce, 1972

References

External links

Palaemonoidea
Taxa named by Constantine Samuel Rafinesque
Decapod families